"Tonight" is a song by American singer and rapper Doja Cat featuring American rapper Eve. It was released as the seventeenth track on the deluxe edition of Doja Cat's third studio album Planet Her, which was released through Kemosabe and RCA Records on June 27, 2021.

Background and composition
Two days after Planet Her was released, a deluxe edition was issued with five additional tracks, including "Tonight". Doja Cat had previously hinted towards the release of "Tonight" in a YouTube interview, where she announced that a collaboration with American rapper Eve would be featuring on Planet Her. Musically, the song features a spare beat, a nylon-string plucked guitar progression, and ringing bells. "Tonight" was produced by Dr. Luke and Rob "Reef" Tewlow. The song was deemed by BrooklynVegan as having "maximalist 2000s R&B-style production".

Critical reception
A Billboard article by Gil Kaufman was generally positive towards "Tonight", calling the song a "slinky duet". Kaufman wrote that "Doja comes on strong in the first verse", while "all bets are off" during Eve's verse. Jason Lipshutz, also of Billboard, wrote that the song "sounds beamed in from the best rhythmic pop playlist from 2002". Regina Cho of Revolt praised Eve's guest feature, opining that she "swoops in with her signature style effortlessly". Staff writers for BrooklynVegan were similarly approving of Eve's "bulletproof verse". XXL writers declared that the "finger-plucking acoustic guitar riff" on "Tonight" called back to rap stylings of the 2000s, and asserted that Eve sounded "just as cocksure as she did during her run with the Ruff Ryders label in the 1990s" on the song.

Credits and personnel
Credits adapted from Tidal.

 Doja Cat – vocals, songwriting, production
 Eve – vocals, songwriting
 Taneisha Jackson – songwriting
 Rob "Reef" Tewlow – songwriting, production
 Kalani Thompson – assistant production, engineering
 Danielle Alvarez – assistant production
 Tyler Sheppard – engineering
 Mike Bozzi – mastering
 Clint Gibbs – mixing
 Seth Ringo – assistant engineering

References

2021 songs
Doja Cat songs
Eve (rapper) songs
Songs written by Doja Cat
Songs written by Eve (rapper)